Connellia nutans is a plant species in the genus Connellia. This species is endemic to Venezuela.

References

nutans
Flora of Venezuela